Silvia Patricia Valdés Quezada (born 1953) is a lawyer who is serving as the third female president of the Supreme Court of Justice and the judicial branch of Guatemala.

Education 
Silvia Valdés has a Bachelor's degree in Social and Juridical Sciences with an Attorney and Notary degree, and two doctorates in law and justice administration from the Mariano Gálvez university. She also has Master degrees in societary and procedural law from several universities.

Career 
She started her career as a bailiff in 1976 and later became judge. She was head of a civil court in 2000 for 9 years and later president of a civil appeals court. She was reportedly backed by the private sector and official apparatus at the time of president of the republic Otto Pérez when she was first elected magistrate of the Supreme Court (CSJ) by the Guatemalan Congress for the period 20142019. In 2015 there was controversy after a judge assigned for her use an impounded luxury car that was reported stolen, something that was opposed by the prosecutor's office.

Voided appointment, resignation, and presidency 
Silvia Valdés was elected president of the Supreme Court of Justice on 26 September 2016. But in January 2017, the Constitutional Court of Guatemala voided her appointment of a year term because of improper procedure in the process. But given that Valdés was the first-magistrate, she was entitled to be interim president. Nery Medina was elected in her place for the top office on 9 February 2017.

On 13 June 2019after her official term as magistrate expiredshe tendered her resignation to Congress, which didn't accept it. By October 2021, the legislative body had not elected for two years magistrates for the new term, due to a series of irregularities and legal actions. Valdés and her peers continued in their positions in the Court, required by laweven though the Guatemalan Constitution provides for only a single 5-year period for the magistrates.

In April 2022, the Constitutional Court stopped the possibility of investigating Valdés while in office for a corruption case. She was linked by a prosecutor's office (FECI) to a network who sought to peddle influence in the election of judicial officials.

The Department of State compiled a document known as the Engel List to point out controversial personalities in Guatemala. Valdés criticized it, stating that it violated the Guatemalan Constitution and that people are presumed innocent until found guilty in a court of law. She also said that it was an intrusion in Guatemalan internal affairs.

References 

Living people
Guatemalan judges
1953 births